Jason Young (born 22 July 1979) is a Zimbabwean cricketer. He played eight first-class matches between 1999 and 2001.

See also
 CFX Academy cricket team

References

External links
 

1979 births
Living people
Zimbabwean cricketers
CFX Academy cricketers
Manicaland cricketers
Sportspeople from Harare